"Rise Up" is a song by Greek electronic duo Freaky Fortune featuring Greek rapper RiskyKidd. It was chosen to represent Greece at the Eurovision Song Contest 2014 in Denmark.

Critical reception
The song received mixed to positive reviews. Daily Mirror entertainment writer Carl Greenwood gave the song 1 star out of 5 and said, "Rise Up is the sort of song that gets stuck in your head." Jess Denham of The Independent, "Rise Up" has a definite holiday vibe to it, just in time for the start of summer."

Eurovision Song Contest

On 11 March 2014 Freaky Fortune and RiskyKidd participates to the Greek national final of Eurovision Song Contest 2014. After performing the song under number two at the national final, it got the 36.83% of votes and became the Greek entry in the 2014 Eurovision.

At the Eurovision Song Contest they performed 13th in the second semi-final on 8 May 2014. The song qualified from the second semi-final and competed in the final on 10 May 2014. In the final at the end of the voting, it had received 35 points, placing on 20th place in a field of 26 songs. It was, along with 1998, the worst placing ever for Greece.

Track listing

Credits and personnel
Vocals - Nicolas Raptakis and Shane Schuller
Lyrics - Nicolas Raptakis, Theofilos Pouzbouris and Shane Schuller
Composer - Nicolas Raptakis and Theofilos Pouzbouris

Chart performance

Weekly charts

References

External links

English-language Greek songs
Eurovision songs of Greece
Eurovision songs of 2014
Articles containing video clips
2014 songs